The 2021 Southampton City Council election took place in on 6 May 2021, on the same day as other local elections, to elect members of Southampton City Council. The election was originally due to take place in May 2020, to elect to the seats of councillors last elected in 2016, but was postponed due to the COVID-19 pandemic.
 
Council elections for the Southampton City Council were last held on 2 May 2019 as part of the 2019 United Kingdom local elections. The 2019 Southampton City Council election resulted in an increased number of seats for the Labour Party, from 26 to 29.
 
All locally registered electors (British, Irish, Commonwealth and European Union citizens) who are aged 18 or over on polling day were entitled to vote in the local elections.
 
The Statement of Persons Nominated was published on Friday 9 April 2021.

The Conservatives gained 6 seats from the Labour Party and one seat from an Independent giving them a total of 25 seats on the new council, as compared with 23 seats for Labour. This gave the Conservative Party control of the council for the first time since 2012.

In the Ward results which appear below, increases/decreases in shares of the vote, and resultant swings, are calculated by reference to the 2016 election, when these seats were last fought.

Results summary

Ward results

References

 

Southampton
Southampton City Council elections
2020s in Southampton
2020s in Hampshire
May 2021 events in the United Kingdom